In geometry, pinwheel tilings are non-periodic tilings defined by Charles Radin and based on a construction due to John Conway.
They are the first known non-periodic tilings to each have the property that their tiles appear in infinitely many orientations.

Conway's tessellation

Conway noticed that  can be divided in five isometric copies of its image by the dilation of factor .

Despite this, all the vertices have rational coordinates.

The pinwheel tilings

Radin relied on the above construction of Conway to define pinwheel tilings.
In other words, the tiles of any pinwheel tilings can be grouped in sets of five into homothetic tiles, so that these homothetic tiles form (up to rescaling) a new pinwheel tiling.

The tiling constructed by Conway is a pinwheel tiling, but there are uncountably many other different pinwheel tiling.
They are all locally undistinguishable (i.e., they have the same finite patches).
They all share with the Conway tiling the property that tiles appear in infinitely many orientations (and vertices have rational coordinates).

In terms of symbolic dynamics, this means that the pinwheel tilings form a sofic subshift.

Generalizations

Radin and Conway proposed a three-dimensional analogue which was dubbed the quaquaversal tiling. There are other variants and generalizations of the original idea.

One gets a fractal by iteratively dividing  in five isometric copies, following the Conway construction, and discarding the middle triangle (ad infinitum). This "pinwheel fractal" has Hausdorff dimension .

Use in architecture

Federation Square, a building complex in Melbourne, Australia, features the pinwheel tiling.  In the project, the tiling pattern is used to create the structural sub-framing for the facades, allowing for the facades to be fabricated off-site, in a factory and later erected to form the facades.  The pinwheel tiling system was based on the single triangular element, composed of zinc, perforated zinc, sandstone or glass (known as a tile), which was joined to 4 other similar tiles on an aluminum frame, to form a "panel".  Five panels were affixed to a galvanized steel frame, forming a "mega-panel", which were then hoisted onto support frames for the facade.  The rotational positioning of the tiles gives the facades a more random, uncertain compositional quality, even though the process of its construction is based on pre-fabrication and repetition.  The same pinwheel tiling system is used in the development of the structural frame and glazing for the "Atrium" at Federation Square, although in this instance, the pin-wheel grid has been made "3-dimensional" to form a portal frame structure.

References

External links
 Pinwheel at the Tilings Encyclopedia
 Dynamic Pinwheel made in GeoGebra

Discrete geometry
Aperiodic tilings